Iron Man is a 1931 American pre-Code sports drama film directed by Tod Browning and starring Lew Ayres and Jean Harlow. In 1951, Universal remade the film with Jeff Chandler, Evelyn Keyes and Rock Hudson, directed by Joseph Pevney.

A prizefighter is abandoned by his wife due to his failing career. Following his first winning streak, his wife returns to him, but fools her husband into hiring her lover as his new boxing manager, despite his lack of experience.

Plot
After lightweight prizefighter Kid Mason (Ayres) loses his opening fight, golddigging wife Rose (Harlow) leaves him for Hollywood. Without her around, Mason trains seriously and starts winning. Naturally, Rose returns and worms her way back into his life, despite the misgivings of manager George Regan (Armstrong). Eventually, she cons Mason into dumping Regan and replacing him with her secret lover Lewis (Miljan), even though he has almost no experience in the fight game. To make matters worse, Mason's high living and neglect of his training threatens his latest title defense.

Cast
 Lew Ayres as Kid Mason
 Robert Armstrong as George Regan
 Jean Harlow as Rose Mason
 John Miljan as Paul H. Lewis
 Edward Dillon as Jeff
 Mike Donlin as McNeil
 Morrie Cohan as Rattler O'Keefe
 Mary Doran as Showgirl
 Mildred Van Dorn as Gladys DeVere
 Ned Sparks as Riley
 Sammy Blum as Mandel

References

Notes

Bibliography

External links
 
 

1930s American films
1930s English-language films
1930s sports drama films
1931 drama films
1931 films
Adultery in films
American black-and-white films
American boxing films
American sports drama films
Films about marriage
Films based on American novels
Films based on works by W. R. Burnett
Films directed by Tod Browning
Films with screenplays by Francis Edward Faragoh
Universal Pictures films